Crab Island, called Moent Island in the native language, is a now uninhabited island west of Muttee Heads and the coastal community of Seisia which is adjacent to Bamaga at the tip of Cape York Peninsula within the Endeavour Strait in the Gulf of Carpentaria in Queensland, Australia. The original inhabitants were the Apukwi branch of the Ankamuti.

Crab Island lies between Australia and the Melanesian island of New Guinea in the southwestern part of the Torres Strait, facing the Arafura Sea to the west. It is the most significant breeding ground of the flatback turtle (Natator depressus) and there is occasional nesting by the hawksbill sea turtle (Eretmochelys imbricata) and olive ridley sea turtle (Lepidochelys olivacea) the island it has predators like saltwater crocodile.

This island is south of the Torres Strait Islands.

See also

List of Torres Strait Islands

References 

Torres Strait Islands
Uninhabited islands of Australia